Sinople may refer to:
Sinopia, or sinople, a dark reddish earth pigment
Sinople (heraldry), a term for "red", and later "green" in heraldry
Plovdiv, Bulgaria, a city called “Sinople” by the Crusaders